The 2015 BRD Năstase Țiriac Trophy was a tennis tournament played on outdoor clay courts and held at Arenele BNR in Bucharest, Romania, from 20 to 26 April 2015. It was the 23rd edition of the BRD Năstase Țiriac Trophy tournament, and part of the ATP World Tour 250 Series of the 2015 ATP World Tour.

Points and prize money

Point distribution

Prize money 

* per team

Singles main-draw entrants

Seeds 

 1 Rankings are as of April 13, 2015.

Other entrants  
The following players received wildcards into the singles main draw:
  Marius Copil
  Gaël Monfils
  Janko Tipsarević

The following players received entry from the qualifying draw:
  Thomas Fabbiano
  Lorenzo Giustino
  Nikola Mektić
  Jürgen Zopp

Withdrawals 
Before the tournament
  Carlos Berlocq →replaced by Andrey Golubev
  Sam Querrey →replaced by Daniel Gimeno Traver
  Andreas Seppi →replaced by Malek Jaziri

Doubles main-draw entrants

Seeds 

 Rankings are as of April 13, 2015.

Other entrants 
The following pairs received wildcards into the doubles main draw:
  Marius Copil /  Adrian Ungur
  Patrick Grigoriu /  Costin Pavăl

The following pairs received entry as alternates:
  Andrey Golubev /  Denis Istomin
  Dušan Lajović /  Diego Schwartzman

Withdrawals 
Before the tournament
  Marcos Baghdatis (lower back injury)
  Horia Tecău (right forearm injury)
  Viktor Troicki (lower back injury)

Retirements 
  Steve Darcis (wrist injury)

Finals

Singles 

  Guillermo García López defeated  Jiří Veselý, 7–6(7–5), 7–6(13–11)

Doubles 

  Marius Copil /  Adrian Ungur defeated  Nicholas Monroe /  Artem Sitak, 3–6, 7–5, [17–15]

References

External links
Official website

 

BRD Nastase Tiriac Trophy
Romanian Open
BRD Nastase Tiriac Trophy
April 2015 sports events in Europe